James Allen Chaney (born January 12, 1962) is an American football coach and former player who is an offensive analyst for the Georgia Tech Yellow Jackets. He previously served as an offensive analyst for the New Orleans Saints of the National Football League (NFL).  Chaney previously served in the same capacity at the University of Georgia from 2015 to 2018. Chaney also served as the offensive coordinator at University of Arkansas from 2013 to 2014 and University of Tennessee from 2009 to 2012, assuming the role of interim head coach for the final game of the 2012 season after Derek Dooley was fired. He was also the offensive coordinator at the University of Tennessee from 2019 to 2020, under Head Coach Jeremy Pruitt

Coaching career
Chaney served as the offensive coordinator and multiple other assistant positions for other NCAA football programs such as: Purdue, Wyoming, Cal State Fullerton, and Western Michigan. Between 2006 and 2009, he served as an assistant coach for the St. Louis Rams of the National Football League (NFL), working with the offensive line and tight ends. Chaney was brought to Tennessee in 2009 by Lane Kiffin. After the hiring of Derek Dooley in January 2010, it was confirmed that Chaney would remain at Tennessee as the offensive coordinator. Tennessee named Chaney as the interim head coach on November 18, 2012, after it fired Dooley.  Six days later, Chaney won his only game as interim head coach as Tennessee defeated Kentucky 37–17. On January 8, 2019, Chaney was hired to return to the University of Tennessee to serve as Jeremy Pruitt's Offensive Coordinator.

Offensive philosophy
While at Purdue, Chaney, along with head coach Joe Tiller, became known for using the spread offense – famously dubbed "basketball on grass" – at a time when it was still considered a novelty and not commonly used. The system relied on a strong passing game and Chaney's offense was one of the most potent in the country. This was evidenced by the fact that future Super Bowl-winning quarterback Drew Brees (starting quarterback from 1997-2000) thrived in Chaney's offense and went on to break and set college, Big Ten and NCAA records.

When Urban Meyer took his first coaching job at Bowling Green, he sought advice from several of the best coaches using the spread offense, including Jim Chaney. After spending a few years in the NFL Chaney gained a newfound appreciation for the pro-style offense. When Chaney came to Tennessee, he and Kiffin fielded a very pro-style offense, very similar to what Kiffin used at USC.

Personal life
Jim is married to Lisa Chaney. The couple have two daughters, Elizabeth Chaney and Sara Chaney.

Head coaching record

References

External links
 Tennessee Volunteers bio
 Georgia Bulldogs bio

1962 births
Living people
American football defensive tackles
Arkansas Razorbacks football coaches
Cal State Fullerton Titans football coaches
Central Missouri Mules football players
Georgia Bulldogs football coaches
Pittsburgh Panthers football coaches
Purdue Boilermakers football coaches
St. Louis Rams coaches
Tennessee Volunteers football coaches
Western Michigan Broncos football coaches
Wyoming Cowboys football coaches
People from Holden, Missouri
Players of American football from Missouri